Prataprao Baburao Bhosale (25 October 1934, Bhuinj in Satara district, Maharashtra) is a leader of Indian National Congress from Maharashtra. He served as member of the Lok Sabha representing Satara constituency. He was elected to 8th, 9th and 10th Lok Sabha. He was Member of Maharashtra Legislative Assembly from Wai constituency from 1967 to 1985 and also served state cabinet in various ministry.

References

India MPs 1991–1996
People from Satara district
1934 births
Living people
Indian National Congress politicians 
India MPs 1989–1991
India MPs 1984–1989
Lok Sabha members from Maharashtra
Maharashtra MLAs 1967–1972
Maharashtra MLAs 1978–1980
Maharashtra MLAs 1980–1985
Indian National Congress (U) politicians
Indian National Congress politicians from Maharashtra